Science Education is a bimonthly peer-reviewed scientific journal covering science education. It was established in 1916 as General Science Quarterly, obtaining its current name in 1929. The editors-in-chief are Sherry A. Southerland (Florida State University) and John Settlage (University of Connecticut). According to the Journal Citation Reports, the journal has a 2020 impact factor of 4.593, ranking it 31st out of 265 journals in the category "Education & Educational Research)".

References

External links

Publications established in 1916
Bimonthly journals
Wiley (publisher) academic journals
Science education journals
English-language journals